Salix × fragilis, with the common names crack willow and brittle willow, is a hybrid species of willow native to Europe and Western Asia. It is native to riparian habitats, usually found growing beside rivers and streams, and in marshes and water meadow channels. It is a hybrid between Salix euxina and Salix alba, and is very variable, with forms linking both parents.

Description
The bark is dark grey-brown, coarsely fissured in older trees. The lanceolate leaves are bright green, 9–15 cm long and 1.5–3 cm wide, with a finely serrated margin; they are very finely hairy at first in spring, but soon become hairless.

The flowers are produced in catkins in early spring, and pollinated by insects. They are dioecious, with male and female catkins on separate trees; the male catkins are 4–6 cm long, the female catkins are also 4–6 cm long, with the individual flowers having either one or two nectaries. In late spring fruit capsules release numerous small cotton-tufted seeds. They are easily distributed by wind and moving water, and germinate immediately after soil contact.

Taxonomy
Carl Linnaeus first described a willow species as  "Salix fragilis" in 1753. It was later discovered that Linnaeus was actually describing a species he had also called Salix pentandra. At least since the 1920s, botanists applied Linnaeus's name "Salix fragilis" both to a pure species and to its hybrid with Salix alba. In 2005, it was proposed that "Salix fragilis" should be conserved for the pure species, with the hybrid called "Salix × rubens". The alternative was to conserve "Salix fragilis" for the hybrid, with the pure species requiring a new name. After discussion, the decision was made by the Nomenclature Committee for Vascular Plants in 2009 to reject the first proposal and conserve "Salix fragilis" for the hybrid. Irina V. Belyaeva then described the previously unnamed parent species as Salix euxina, and designated a lectotype for the hybrid. The lectotype was shown by molecular evidence to be the hybrid between S. alba and S. euxina, the name of which is written as Salix × fragilis to show its hybrid status.

Varieties
S. × fragilis is very variable, with forms linking both parents. Some formally named varieties include the following. , none were accepted at this rank by Plants of the World Online, being treated as synonyms of the species. Clive A. Stace suggested some would be better treated as cultivars.
S. × fragilis var. decipiens W.D.J.Koch (S. × decipiens Hoffm.) – assigned to S. × fragilis by Plants of the World Online and by Belyaeva, but to S. euxina by Stace
S. × fragilis var. furcata Ser. ex Gaudin – male tree with relatively wide leaves; of cultivated origin
S. × fragilis var. fragilis – male and female trees known; leaves with even, well spaced teeth
S. × fragilis var. glauca Spenn.
S. × fragilis var. polyandra Wimm.
S. × fragilis var. rubens (Schrank) P.D.Sell
S. × fragilis var. russelliana (Sm.) W.D.J.Koch – Bedford willow; female tree with long narrow leaves having somewhat uneven teeth; of cultivated origin

Ecology
The plant is commonly called crack willow or brittle willow because it is highly susceptible to wind, ice and snow damage. The name also derives from the twigs which break off very easily and cleanly at the base with an audible crack. Broken twigs and branches can take root readily, enabling the species to colonise new areas as broken twigs fall into waterways and can be carried some distance downstream. It is particularly adept at colonising new riverside sandbanks formed after floods. It also spreads by root suckers, expanding into pure 'groves'.

Cultivation
Salix × fragilis is cultivated as a fast-growing ornamental tree. The cultivar 'Russelliana' (syn. S. × fragilis var. russelliana) is by far the most common clone of crack willow in Great Britain and  Ireland, very easily propagated by cuttings. It is a female clone.

Invasive species
Salix × fragilis has escaped cultivation to become an invasive species in various parts of the world,  including: all states and territories in Australia, New Zealand; the upper half of the United States; and South Africa. In New Zealand it is listed on the National Pest Plant Accord, which means it cannot be sold or distributed. It can replace a habitat's native plant species diversity by forming monospecific stands. As only the male plant is present in New Zealand no fruit is formed unless hybridised. Species spread is facilitated by stem fragmentation which are carried via waterways. Control and management for habitat restoration projects often uses herbicides.

References

External links

 USFS—United States Forest Service: Salix fragilis — "Weed of the Week" 
  Center for Invasive Species and Ecosystem Health—Invasive.org — photos gallery.
 

fragilis
Trees of Europe
Flora of Western Asia
Garden plants of Europe
Flora of Ukraine
Ornamental trees
Plants described in 1753
Taxa named by Carl Linnaeus
Plant nothospecies